Sebastian Glasner (born 6 May 1985) is a German footballer who plays as a striker for SG Quelle Fürth.

Career
In summer 2014, Glasner joined Chemnitzer FC on loan for following 2014–15 season.

References

External links

1985 births
Living people
People from Treuchtlingen
Sportspeople from Middle Franconia
German footballers
Germany youth international footballers
1. FC Nürnberg II players
Wormatia Worms players
SV Darmstadt 98 players
FC Erzgebirge Aue players
SV Wacker Burghausen players
FC Energie Cottbus players
Arminia Bielefeld players
FC Viktoria Köln players
Chemnitzer FC players
2. Bundesliga players
3. Liga players
Association football forwards
Footballers from Bavaria